Triathlon made its official debut at the 2000 Summer Olympics in Sydney, Australia. This sporting event was held at the Sydney Opera House. Forty-eight triathletes contested the female event on September 16, while fifty-two contested the male event on September 17, making up a total of 100 competitors. Each competitor starts the event with a 1500-metre swim course, followed by a 40 kilometre road bicycle race and finish with a 10 kilometre road run. Each consecutive event in triathlon runs in sequence, without any respite, so that the athlete who crossed the line in first place at the end of the run would be the winner.

Medalists
Five nations won medals in the two inaugural triathlon events.  Switzerland was the only nation to earn more than one, winning a gold and a bronze in the women's competition.

Schedule
All times are Australian Time (UTC+10)

Medal table

References
Official Olympic Report
Official Results – Triathlon

 
Triathlon at the Summer Olympics
2000 Summer Olympics events
O